Aram Gharabekian (4 July 1955 – 10 January 2014) was an Iranian-born Armenian conductor, former Artistic Director and Principal Conductor of the National Chamber Orchestra of Armenia. In 1983 he founded and until 1996 directed and conducted the Boston SinfoNova Orchestra.

Biography
Aram Gharabekian was born into an Armenian family in Tehran, Iran, on 4 July 1955. He moved to the United States at the age of 17. He graduated from the New England Conservatory in Boston, then continued his postgraduate studies at Mainz University in Germany. He studied conducting with Franco Ferrara in Italy, and in 1979 became one of a few conducting pupils of Sergiu Celibidache in Germany. Gharabekian also studied composition and conducting under Jacob Druckman and Leonard Bernstein at Tanglewood Music Center in Massachusetts.

Gharabekian died in Los Angeles on 10 January 2014 at the age of 58.

Awards
1989 Lucien Wulsin Performance Award
1988 American Society of Composers, Authors and Publishers (ASCAP) Award for Adventuresome Programming
 Harvard Musical Association's "Best Performance Award"

References

External links
Aram Gharabekyan - Armenian National Music
Biography

1955 births
2014 deaths
People from Tehran
Iranian people of Armenian descent
American people of Armenian descent
Iranian emigrants to the United States
Ethnic Armenian musicians
New England Conservatory alumni
Johannes Gutenberg University Mainz alumni